Hannah's Meadows  is a Site of Special Scientific Interest in the Teesdale district of south-west County Durham, England. It consists of three fields, located at Low Birk Hatt Farm, on the north side of Blackton Reservoir, in Baldersdale, some 7 km west of the village of Cotherstone. The site is named after Hannah Hauxwell, whose farm it was for over 50 years.

Because Miss Hauxwell employed traditional farming practices, with no re-seeding and no artificial fertilisers, the meadows are thought to be the least improved in upland Durham, and, as a result, have a very rich floral composition, including rare species such as frog orchid, Coeloglossum viride, moonwort, Botrychium lunaria, and adder's-tongue, Ophioglossum vulgatum.

In 1988, Low Birk Hatt Farm was purchased by the Durham Wildlife Trust, which now manages it as Hannah's Meadows nature reserve; one of the farm buildings—which are excluded from the SSSI—has been renovated as an unmanned visitor centre. In order to preserve the special characteristics of the site, the Trust continues to manage the farm in the traditional manner.

Norse Mythology of Baldersdale

River Balder and Hunder Beck
The nature reserve is beside Blackton Reservoir and is close to the point where the River Balder and Hunder Beck meet and enter the reservoir.

The River Balder is named after the Norse God "Balder". The Hunder Beck is named after the Norse God "Thunder".

According to Norse mythology, "Balder" and "Thunder" are both sons of the Norse God "Odin".

The River Balder rises from its source on Stainmore Common and flows in an easterly direction until it joins the River Tees near Cotherstone.

According to Roger of Wendover, the Viking ruler Eric Bloodaxe was betrayed and killed on Stainmore in AD 954, while on the run and after being expelled from York. Following his death a famous poem was written about him called Eiríksmál.

Eiríksmál Verse 3 

In verse 3 the Norse God "Odin" exclaims to the legendary poet "Bragi":

the legendary poet   ” Bragi ”  replies :

Shacklesborough and Goldsborough Carr

Shacklesborough and Goldsborough Carr are isolated, flat-topped hills that dominate the Baldersdale landscape.

 Shacklesborough (454m) is about 3 km South West of Hannah's Meadows

 Goldsborough Carr (389m) is about 2 km South East of Hannah's Meadows

According to Norse Mythology, Balder died after the mischief-maker Loki tricked the blind Höðr into killing Balder with a spear made from mistletoe.

Odin was so outraged by the death of his son Balder, rather than killing Loki outright, he arranged for Loki to be bound and "shackled", so that he would spend the remainder of his days (until Ragnarök at least) being tortured. The story is narrated in the poem Lokasenna.

Several stone crosses or fragments have been found in the local area that are believed to depict "the bondage of Loki".

  The Loki Stone, St Stephen's Church, Kirkby Stephen, Cumbria, England. 

   Loki, Archaeological record, Gainford, County Durham, England. 

 Gosforth Cross, Cumbria, England.

The name Goldsborough is derived from a story about Loki in the poem Reginsmál.

See also

Examples of Norse Mythology in the North of England

 Bowder Stone, Borrowdale, Cumbria, England - "Balder's Steinn" or "Baldur's Steinn" .

 Roseberry Topping, North Yorkshire, England - "Othenesberg" (1119), "Othon's Bjarg", "Odin's Rock".

Sources

Online

Eiríksmál in Old Norse from «Kulturformidlingen norrøne tekster og kvad» Norway.

Books

Notes

Citations

Sites of Special Scientific Interest in County Durham
Nature reserves of the Durham Wildlife Trust
Meadows in County Durham